The FIVB World Grand Prix 2004 was the twelfth edition of the annual women's volleyball tournament, which is the female equivalent of the Men's Volleyball World League. The 2004 edition was played by twelve countries from July 9 to August 1, 2004, with the final round held in Reggio Calabria, Italy. Hosts Italy and the top five ranked teams after the preliminary rounds qualified for the last round.

Qualification

Asia
The top four Asian teams according to the FIVB World Rankings

Europe
European Qualification Tournament in Piła, Poland from August 26 to August 31, 2003

|}

|}

North and South America
Pan-American Cup in Coahuila and Saltillo, Mexico from June 30 to July 5, 2003

Teams

Preliminary rounds

Ranking
The host Italy and top five teams in the preliminary round advance to the Final round.

|}

First round

Group A
Venue: Nimiboot Gymnasium, Bangkok, Thailand

|}

Group B
Venue: Miao Li County Dome, Miaoli, Taiwan

|}

Group C
Venue: Todoriki Arena, Kawasaki, Japan

|}

Second round

Group D
Venue: Philsport Arena, Manila, Philippines

|}

Group E
Venue: Hong Kong Coliseum, Hong Kong

|}

Group F
Venue: Istora, Jakarta, Indonesia

|}

Third round

Group G
Venue: Stadthalle Rostock, Rostock, Germany

|}

Group H
Venue: Hong San Huan, Hefei, China

|}

Group I
Venue: Halla Gymnasium, Jeju, South Korea

|}

Final round
Venue: PalaCalafiore, Reggio Calabria, Italy

Pool play

Group A

|}

|}

Group B

|}

|}

Final four

Semifinals

|}

5th place match

|}

3rd place match

|}

Final

|}

Overall ranking

Individual awards

Most Valuable Player:

Best Scorer:

Best Spiker:

Best Blocker:

Best Server:

Best Setter:

Best Libero:

Fair Play Award:

Most Popular Player:

Dream Team

Setter:

Middle Blocker:

Outside Hitters:

Opposite Hitter:

References
 FIVB
 Results
 CEV Qualification Results

FIVB World Grand Prix
Volleyball
V
2004